Impractical Jokers is an American hidden camera-practical joke reality television series that premiered on TruTV on December 15, 2011. It follows the three members of the comedy troupe The Tenderloins as they coerce one another into doing public pranks while being filmed by hidden cameras.

Series overview

Episodes

Season 1 (2011–12)

Season 2 (2012–13)

Season 3 (2014)

Season 4 (2015)

Season 5 (2016)

Season 6 (2017)

Season 7 (2018)

Season 8 (2019–20)

Season 9 (2021–22)

Season 10

Specials

Banned episodes
Following Joe Gatto's departure from the show in December 2021, eight episodes of the show were banned from television, with only three of these episodes still available to stream on HBO Max in the US.

The following episodes were banned from TV and removed from HBO Max (unless noted otherwise):
 "Boardwalk of Shame" (Season 1, Episode 4)
 "Deal with the Devils" (Season 4, Episode 7)
 "The Dream Crusher" (Season 4, Episode 9)
 "Kill the Centaur" (Season 4, Episode 15)
 "Stripped of Dignity" (Season 4, Episode 24)
 "Bull Shiatsu" (Season 7, Episode 12)
 "Sun-Fan Lotion" (Season 8, Episode 16)
 "Rock Bottom" (Season 8, Episode 25)

Notes

References

Impractical Jokers
Lists of American comedy television series episodes
Lists of American non-fiction television series episodes